The 47th International Emmy Awards took place on November 25, 2019, at the New York Hilton Midtown in New York City. The award ceremony, presented by the International Academy of Television Arts and Sciences (IATAS), honors all TV programming produced and originally aired outside the United States and celebrated excellence in International television.

Ceremony
Nominations for the 47th International Emmy Awards were announced on September 19, 2019, by the International Academy of Television Arts & Sciences (IATAS). There are 44 Nominees across 11 categories and 21 countries. Nominees come from: Argentina, Australia, Belgium, Brazil, Canada, Colombia, Finland, France, Germany, Hungary, India, Israel, the Netherlands, Portugal, Qatar, Singapore, South Africa, South Korea, Turkey, the United Kingdom and the United States.

In addition to the presentation of the International Emmys for programming and performances, the International Academy presented two special awards. Game of Thrones‘ creators and showrunners David Benioff and D. B. Weiss, received the Founders Award, and Christiane Amanpour, Chief International Anchor for CNN and host of PBS’ nightly global affairs show Amanpour, received the Directorate Award.

Summary

Winners and nominees

References

External links 
 Official website

International Emmy Awards ceremonies
International
International Emmy Awards